Juli Veee (born Gyula Visnyei; February 22, 1950) is a Hungarian-American retired soccer forward. Announced as "Double-deuce, triple-E, the one and only Juli Veee", Veee experienced his greatest success as an indoor player with the San Diego Sockers.  He also earned four caps, scoring two goals, with the U.S. national team.

Youth
Veee grew up impoverished in Budapest, Hungary. The communist government controlled nearly every aspect of a Hungarian's life and when Veee turned fifteen he was given a choice, pursue a career in table tennis or soccer.  He chose soccer.  Chafing under the restrictions of his homeland under a totalitarian regime, Veee defected when he was eighteen years old while on a tour of Western Europe with the Hungarian U-21 national team.  He began his professional career in France before moving to the United States.

NASL
In 1975, he moved to the U.S. where he signed with the Los Angeles Aztecs of the North American Soccer League.  That season, he played in nineteen games, scoring six goals.  He was traded to the San Jose Earthquakes for the 1976 season.

At the completion of the 1976 NASL season, Veee moved to Belgium where he signed with First Division club Lierse. He spent one season with Lierse before moving to Standard Liège for the 1977-1978 season. Veee returned to the NASL to play for the San Diego Sockers from 1978-1982. Veee was a fan favorite for the Sockers.

NASL indoor
Veee played for San Jose during the 1976 indoor tournament and led the competition with eight goals. A few years later the NASL started an indoor league, in which the Sockers participated in 1980-81, 1981–82, 1983-84. San Diego won the championship in the 1981-82 and 1983-84 seasons. Juli Veee was their star. He went on to play with the Sockers in the MISL. Overall, the Sockers won 10 indoor soccer championships (two in the NASL, and eight more in the MISL). Veee finished his career with the Sockers with 254 goals and 214 assists.

Veee was described in a 1984 Sports Illustrated article as a player "who would find it tough to hold a place on a European third-division side, [and who] recognizes that the simplistic indoor version suits his talents better than the grown-ups' game." In the same article Veee was quoted as stating, "tell the rest of the world to go on playing in the mud and rain...we'll get rich while staying clean. The future of American soccer is indoors."

MISL
He began his career in the Major Indoor Soccer League (MISL) with the New York Arrows.  His greatest achievement in soccer probably came as he led the San Diego Sockers to five championships.  He was MVP three times.  He was the 1982-1983 championship series MVP.  At the end of the 1984 season, the Sockers traded Veee to the Las Vegas Americans for whom he played a single season.  In 1985, he returned to the Sockers and finished his career with them in 1988.

National team
Veee earned four caps with the US national team after he became a US citizen.  His first game with the national team came in an October 15, 1976 loss to Mexico.  He scored his first national team goal five days later in a victory over Canada.  He played one more game in 1976, then did not earn another cap until his last one.  That came in the only game the U.S. played in 1982, a 2-1 victory over Trinidad on March 21, 1982.  Veee also scored his second national team goal in that game.

Veee was also a member of the U.S. team which qualified for the 1980 Summer Olympics.  While Veee scored a goal in the U.S. tie with Suriname which led to the U.S. qualifying for the games, President Carter cancelled the U.S. participation in those games as punishment for the Soviet invasion of Afghanistan. Because FIFA does not recognize Olympic and Olympic qualifying matches as full internationals, these games are not included in Veee's national team statistics.

Post playing career
After retiring in 1988,  while he had become an artist and book collector these did not provide enough income at the time for him to make a living.  A local youth coach who knew Veee asked him to help out with the coach's team.  Veee needed income, so he agreed.  He quickly discovered that he loved coaching and it has become his second career. His coaching jobs include three years with the San Dieguito Surf and two years as coach of the Pegasus. In 2005, became the head coach of the La Costa Canyon High School girls team. He decided to become a high school coach due to dissatisfaction with regression his club players experienced during the high school season.  Veee concluded that the low quality of high school soccer hurt his club and decided the best way to raise that quality was through his personal attention.

In 1994 he was commissioned to be the artist for the 1994 World Cup hosted by multiple cities across the United States. The LA venue held Soccerfest, A Magical World, at the Los Angeles Convention Center July 8–17, 1994 exhibiting works by Veee.

In 1997, the San Diego Breitbard Hall of Fame inducted Veee, the first soccer player so honored. He was also selected as an inaugural member of the Indoor Soccer Hall of Fame in 2011.

References

External links
 Artist profile
 Article about Veee's coaching
 NASL and MISL stats

1950 births
Living people
American soccer players
Lierse S.K. players
Standard Liège players
Expatriate footballers in Belgium
Belgian Pro League players
Hungarian emigrants to the United States
Hungarian expatriate footballers
Hungarian footballers
United States men's international soccer players
North American Soccer League (1968–1984) players
North American Soccer League (1968–1984) indoor players
Los Angeles Aztecs players
San Jose Earthquakes (1974–1988) players
San Diego Sockers (NASL) players
Major Indoor Soccer League (1978–1992) players
New York Arrows players
Las Vegas Americans players
San Diego Sockers (original MISL) players
American soccer coaches
Footballers from Budapest
Association football forwards